2-Amino-4-deoxychorismate dehydrogenase (ADIC dehydrogenase, 2-amino-2-deoxyisochorismate dehydrogenase, SgcG) is an enzyme with systematic name (2S)-2-amino-4-deoxychorismate:FMN oxidoreductase. This enzyme catalyses the following chemical reaction

 (2S)-2-amino-4-deoxychorismate + FMN  3-(1-carboxyvinyloxy)anthranilate + FMNH2

This enzyme participates in the formation of the benzoxazolinate moiety of the enediyne antitumour antibiotic C-1027].

References

External links 
 

EC 1.3.99